The 19th Utah Senate District is located in Morgan, Summit, and Weber Counties and includes Utah House Districts 7, 8, 9, 28, 29, 53, and 54. The current State Senator representing the 19th district is Allen M. Christensen. Christensen was elected to the Utah Senate in 2004 and is up for re-election in 2012.

Previous Utah State Senators (District 19)

Election results

2004 General Election

Current Candidates

Note: See footnote for candidate listing guidelines.

|}

See also

 Allen M. Christensen
 Utah Democratic Party
 Utah Libertarian Party
 Utah Republican Party
 Utah Senate

References

External links
 Utah Senate District 19 Map
 Utah Senate District Profiles
 Official Biography of Allen M. Christensen

19
Morgan County, Utah
Summit County, Utah
Weber County, Utah